Gilligan is a surname, and may refer to:

Amy Archer-Gilligan (1873-1962), American serial killer and poisoner
Andrew Gilligan, British journalist
 Arthur Gilligan, English cricketer
Billy Gilligan, Scottish footballer
Carol Gilligan, American feminist ethicist and psychologist
Harold Gilligan, English cricketer
James Gilligan, American psychiatrist and author
Jim Gilligan (born 1946), American college baseball coach
Jimmy Gilligan, former English footballer
John Gilligan, several people
Ruth Gilligan (born 1988), Irish writer and actress
Ryan Gilligan, English footballer
Sam Gilligan, Scottish footballer 
Sandy Gilligan, Scottish footballer
Shannon Gilligan, author of interactive fiction and computer games
Sheri Gilligan (born 1963), American politician
Thomas W. Gilligan, dean of the McCombs School of Business at the University of Texas—Austin
Tim Gilligan, American football player
Tom Gilligan (footballer, born 1978), Australian footballer
Vince Gilligan, screenwriter, director and producer

Fictional characters named Gilligan include:
Gilligan, a fictional character in the TV series Gilligan's Island
Stewie Griffin, a fictional character in the TV series Family Guy, whose middle name is Gilligan

English-language surnames